Teppei Tsuchiya (土谷 鉄平, born December 27, 1982, in Ōita, Ōita) is a Japanese professional baseball infielder.

Tsuchiya announced his retirement on January 26, 2016.

External links

NPB.com

1982 births
Living people
Baseball people from Ōita Prefecture
Japanese baseball players
Nippon Professional Baseball outfielders
Chunichi Dragons players
Tohoku Rakuten Golden Eagles players
Orix Buffaloes players
Japanese baseball coaches
Nippon Professional Baseball coaches